Louis Jacobs may refer to:
 Louis Jacobs (1920–2006), a Masorti rabbi in the United Kingdom
 Louis L. Jacobs, American vertebrate paleontologist
 Louis Jacobs (businessman). American businessman and sports team owner
 Lou Jacobs (footballer) (1884–1936), Australian rules footballer

See also
Lewis Jacobs (1904–1997), American author, director and publisher
Lou Jacobs  (1903–1992), an auguste clown
Louis Jacob (disambiguation)